Jorun Thørring is a Norwegian writer, born in Tromsø in 1955.  She lives in Melhus, is a specialist in gynaecology, and has her own private practice in Trondheim.  She made her literary debut in 2005 with the crime novel Skyggemannen (The Shadow Man).

In 2007 she won the Havmann Award, a literary award for the best Northern Norwegian book published in the previous year, for her novel Tarantellen (The Tarantula).

Bibliography
Skyggemannen (The Shadow Man) – crime novel (2005)
Glassdukkene (The Glass Dolls) – crime novel (2006)
Tarantellen (The Tarantula) – crime novel (2007)
Ildens øye (The Eye of the Fire) – crime novel (2009)

Awards
Havmann Award 2007, for The Tarantella

References

External links
Jorun Thørring at Aschehoug Agency
Jorun Thørring at Aschehoug Publishing House

Norwegian writers
Living people
1955 births
Norwegian novelists
Norwegian crime fiction writers
People from Tromsø
People from Melhus